Next to Me may refer to:

Music

Albums
Next to Me (album), a 2010 album by Ilse DeLange

Songs
 "Next to Me" (Emeli Sandé song), 2012
 "Next to Me" (Imagine Dragons song), 2018
 "Next to Me" (Otto Knows song), 2015
 "Next to Me" (Rüfüs Du Sol song), 2021
 "Next to Me", a song by Jordan Feliz
 "Next to Me", a song by Clyde McPhatter
 "Next to Me", a song by Stealers Wheel from Stealers Wheel, B-side of "Everyone's Agreed That Everything Will Turn Out Fine"
 "Next to Me", a song by Samantha Fox from I Wanna Have Some Fun
 "Next to Me", a song by Nadine Renee from Nadine
 "Next to Me", a song by Truth Hurts from Truthfully Speaking
 "Next to Me", a song by Shayne Ward from Shayne Ward
 "Next to Me", a song by Civil Twilight from Civil Twilight
 "Next to Me", a song by Roy Harper from Death or Glory?
 "Next to Me", a song by CeCe Peniston
 "Next to Me", a song by Ilse DeLange from Next to Me
 "Next to Me", a song by Gavin DeGraw from Gavin DeGraw
 "Next to Me", a song by Cute Is What We Aim For 
 "Next to Me", a song by Zug Izland
 "Next to Me", a song by Steve Grand from All American Boy
 "Next 2 Me", a song by Reks from Grey Hairs

Other
Next to Me (film), a 2015 Serbian film

See also
"Next to You, Next to Me", a 1990 single by Shenandoah